The family of Jakaya Kikwete refers to the family of the 4th President of Tanzania. His immediate family is the First Family of Tanzania.

Immediate family

Spouse
Kikwete married Salma Kikwete in 1989. This was his second marriage.

Children
 Ridhiwani kikwete
 Salama
 Miraj
 Ally
 Khalifa
 MwanaAsha
 Khalfan
 Rashid
 Mohamed
 Zamoyoni

References

Jakaya Kikwete